Meyniman may refer to:
Meyniman (village), Azerbaijan
Birinci Meyniman, Azerbaijan
İkinci Meyniman, Azerbaijan